The Mantra-Rock Dance was a counterculture music event held on , 1967, at the Avalon Ballroom in San Francisco. It was organized by followers of the International Society for Krishna Consciousness (ISKCON) as an opportunity for its founder,  Swami Prabhupada, to address a wider public. It was also a promotional and fundraising effort for their first center on the West Coast of the United States.

The Mantra-Rock Dance featured some of the most prominent Californian rock groups of the time, such as the Grateful Dead and  Big Brother and the Holding Company with Janis Joplin, as well as the then relatively unknown Moby Grape. The bands agreed to appear with Prabhupada and to perform for free; the proceeds were donated to the local Hare Krishna temple. The participation of countercultural leaders considerably boosted the event's popularity; among them were the poet Allen Ginsberg, who led the singing of the Hare Krishna mantra onstage along with Prabhupada, and LSD promoters Timothy Leary and Augustus Owsley Stanley III.

The Mantra-Rock Dance concert was later called "the ultimate high" and "the major spiritual event of the San Francisco hippie era." It led to favorable media exposures for Prabhupada and his followers, and brought the Hare Krishna movement to the wider attention of the American public. The 40th anniversary of the Mantra-Rock Dance was commemorated in 2007 in Berkeley, California.

Background

A. C. Bhaktivedanta Swami Prabhupada (also referred to as "Bhaktivedanta Swami" or "Prabhupada"), a Gaudiya Vaishnava sannyasi and teacher, arrived in New York City from his native India in 1965 and "caught the powerful rising tide" of a counterculture that was fascinated with his homeland and open to new forms of "consciousness-expanding spirituality." After establishing his first American temple in New York City at 26 Second Avenue, Prabhupada requested his early follower Mukunda Das and his wife Janaki Dasi to open a similar ISKCON center on the West Coast of the United States.

Mukunda and Janaki met up with friends from college, who would later come to be known as Shyamasundar Das, Gurudas, Malati Dasi, and Yamuna Dasi. Teaming up with them, Mukunda rented a storefront in the San Francisco Haight-Ashbury neighborhood, which at that time was turning into the hub of the hippie counterculture, and stayed to take care of the developing new center.

Preparation and promotion

To raise funds, gain supporters for the new temple, and to popularize Prabhupada's teachings among the hippie and countercultural audience of the Haight-Ashbury scene, the team decided to hold a charitable rock concert and invited Prabhupada to attend. Despite his position as a Vaishnava sannyasi and some of his New York followers objecting to what they saw as an inappropriate invitation of their guru to a place full of "amplified guitars, pounding drums, wild light shows, and hundreds of drugged hippies," Prabhupada agreed to travel from New York to San Francisco and take part in the event. Using their acquaintance with Rock Scully, manager of the Grateful Dead, and Sam Andrew, founding member and guitarist of the Big Brother and the Holding Company – who were among the most prominent rock bands in California at the time – Shyamasundar and Gurudas secured their consent to perform for charity at the concert, charging only the "musicians' union minimum" of $250. Malati Dasi happened to hear Moby Grape, a relatively unknown group at the time, and she convinced the other team members to invite the band to play at the concert as well.

Another leading countercultural figure, the beatnik poet Allen Ginsberg, was a supporter of Prabhupada. He had met the swami earlier in New York and assisted him in extending his United States visa. Despite disagreeing with many of Prabhupada's required prohibitions, especially the ones pertaining to drugs and promiscuity, Ginsberg often publicly sang the Hare Krishna mantra, which he had learned in India. He made the mantra part of his philosophy and declared that it "brings a state of ecstasy." He was glad that Prabhupada, an authentic swami from India, was now trying to spread the chanting in America. Along with other countercultural ideologues like Timothy Leary, Gary Snyder, and Alan Watts, Ginsberg hoped to incorporate Prabhupada and the chanting of Hare Krishna into the hippie movement. Ginsberg agreed to take part in the Mantra-Rock Dance concert and to introduce the swami to the Haight-Ashbury hippie community.

As for the choice of venue, the team considered both the Fillmore Auditorium and the Avalon Ballroom, finally settling on the latter as its impresario, Chet Helms, appeared to be "more sympathetic to the spirit of the concert" and agreed to let it be used for a charity event. Artist Harvey Cohen, one of the first ISKCON followers, designed a Stanley Mouse-inspired promotional poster with a picture of Prabhupada, details of the event, and a request to "bring cushions, drums, bells, cymbals." To generate interest among members of the countercultural community of Haight-Ashbury, Mukunda published an article entitled "The New Science" in the San Francisco Oracle, a local underground newspaper specializing in alternative spiritual and psychedelic topics. He wrote:
The Haight-Ashbury district is soon to be honored by the presence of His Holiness, A. C. Bhaktivedanta Swami, who will conduct daily classes in the Bhagavad Gita, discussions, chanting, playing instruments, and devotional dancing in a small temple in the neighborhood. ... Swamiji's use of the Hare Krishna Mantra is already known throughout the United States. Swamiji's chanting and dancing is more effective than Hatha or Raja Yoga or listening to Ali Akbar Khan on acid or going to a mixed media rock dance.

When the swami arrived at the San Francisco Airport, 50 to 100 hippies chanting "Hare Krishna" greeted him in the airport lounge with flowers. A few days later the San Francisco Chronicle published an article entitled "Swami in the Hippie Land" in which Prabhupada answered the question, "Do you accept hippies in your temple?" by saying, "Hippies or anyone – I make no distinctions. Everyone is welcome."

Event

The Mantra-Rock Dance was scheduled on Sunday evening, 1967 – a day of the week that Chet Helms deemed odd and unlikely to generate substantial attendance. Admission was fixed at $2.50 and limited to door sales. Despite the apprehensions of the organizers, by the beginning of the concert at 8 PM an audience of nearly 3,000 had gathered at the Avalon Ballroom, filling the hall to its capacity. Latecomers had to wait outside for vacancies in order to enter. Participants were treated on prasad (sanctified food) consisting of orange slices and, regardless of the prohibition on drugs, many in the crowd were smoking marijuana and taking other intoxicants. However, the atmosphere in the hall was peaceful. Strobe lights and a psychedelic liquid light show, along with pictures of Krishna and the words of the Hare Krishna mantra, were projected onto the walls. A few Hells Angels were positioned in the back of the stage as the event's security guards. Prabhupada's biographer Satsvarupa Dasa Goswami thus describes the Mantra-Rock Dance audience:

Almost everyone who came wore bright or unusual costumes: tribal robes, Mexican ponchos, Indian kurtas, "God's-eyes," feathers, and beads. Some hippies brought their own flutes, lutes, gourds, drums, rattles, horns, and guitars. The Hell's Angels, dirty-haired, wearing jeans, boots, and denim jackets and accompanied by their women, made their entrance, carrying chains, smoking cigarettes, and displaying their regalia of German helmets, emblazoned emblems, and so on – everything but their motorcycles, which they had parked outside.

The evening opened with Prabhupada's followers – men in "Merlin gowns" and women in saris – chanting Hare Krishna to an Indian tune, followed by Moby Grape. When the swami himself arrived at 10 PM, the crowd of hippies rose to their feet to greet him respectfully with applause and cheers. Gurudas, one of the event's organizers, describes the effect that Prabhupada's arrival had on the audience, "Then Swami Bhaktivedanta entered. He looked like a Vedic sage, exalted and otherworldly. As he advanced towards the stage, the crowd parted and made way for him, like the surfer riding a wave. He glided onto the stage, sat down and began playing the kartals."

Ginsberg welcomed Prabhupada onto the stage and spoke of his own experiences chanting the Hare Krishna mantra. He translated the meaning of the Sanskrit term mantra as "mind deliverance" and recommended the early-morning kirtans at the local Radha-Krishna temple "for those coming down from LSD who want to stabilize their consciousness upon reentry," calling the temple's activity an "important community service." He introduced Prabhupada and thanked him for leaving his peaceful life in India to bring the mantra to New York's Lower East Side, "where it was probably most needed."

After a short address by Prabhupada, Ginsberg sang "Hare Krishna" to the accompaniment of sitar, tambura, and drums, requesting the audience to "[j]ust sink into the sound vibration, and think of peace." Then Prabhupada stood up and led the audience in dancing and singing, as the Grateful Dead, Big Brother and the Holding Company, and Moby Grape joined the chanting and accompanied the mantra with their musical instruments. The audience eagerly responded, playing their own instruments and dancing in circles. The group chanting continued for almost two hours, and concluded with the swami's prayers in Sanskrit while the audience bowed down on the floor. After Prabhupada left, Janis Joplin took the stage, backed by Big Brother and the Holding Company, and continued the event with the songs "The House of the Rising Sun" and "Ball 'n' Chain" late into the night.

Reaction and effect
The LSD pioneer Timothy Leary, who made an appearance at the Mantra-Rock Dance along with Augustus Owsley Stanley III and even paid the entrance fee, pronounced the event a "beautiful night". Later Ginsberg called the Mantra-Rock Dance "the height of Haight-Ashbury spiritual enthusiasm, the first time that there had been a music scene in San Francisco where everybody could be part of it and participate," while historians referred to it as "the ultimate high" and "the major spiritual event of the San Francisco hippy era."

Moby Grape's performance at the Mantra-Rock Dance catapulted the band onto the professional stage. They subsequently had gigs with The Doors at the Avalon Ballroom and at the "First Love Circus" at the Winterland Arena, and were soon signed to a contract with Columbia Records.

The Mantra-Rock Dance helped raise around $2,000 for the temple and resulted in a massive influx of visitors at the temple's early morning services. Prabhupada's appearance at the Mantra-Rock Dance made such a deep impact on the Haight-Ashbury community that he became a cult hero to most of its groups and members, regardless of their attitudes towards his philosophy or the life restrictions that he taught. The Hare Krishna mantra and dancing became adopted in some ways by all levels of the counterculture, including the Hells Angels, and provided it with a "loose commonality" and reconciliation, as well as with a viable alternative to drugs. As the Hare Krishna movement's popularity with the Haight-Ashbury community continued to increase, Prabhupada and followers chanting and distributing prasad became a customary sight at important events in the locale.

At the same time, as the core group of his followers continued to expand and become more serious about the spiritual discipline, Prabhupada conducted new Vaishnava initiations and named the San Francisco temple "New Jagannatha Puri" after introducing the worship of Jagannath deities of Krishna there. Small replicas of these deities immediately became a "psychedelic hit" worn by many hippies on strings around their necks.

Since the Mantra-Rock Dance brought the Hare Krishna movement to the wider attention of the American public, Prabhupada's increased popularity attracted the interest of the mainstream media. Most notably, he was interviewed on ABC's The Les Crane Show and lectured on the philosophy of Krishna consciousness on a KPFK radio station program hosted by Peter Bergman. Prabhupada's followers also spoke about their activities on the San Francisco radio station KFRC.

On August 18, 2007, a free commemorative event dedicated to the 40th anniversary of the Mantra-Rock Dance was held at the People's Park in Berkeley, California.

Notes

Footnotes

See also

List of jam band music festivals 
List of historic rock festivals

References

External links

YouTube video: Allen Ginsberg and a group of hippies receive Prabhupada at the San Francisco airport on  1967. (0:00–1:01)
"Mantra-Rock Dance" revisited: commemoration of the 40th anniversary at the People's Park in Berkeley, California.  2007.

Counterculture festivals
International Society for Krishna Consciousness
Hinduism in popular culture
Hippie movement
1967 in San Francisco
Janis Joplin
1967 in California
Rock festivals in the United States
Jam band festivals
1967 music festivals
Music festivals established in 1967
January 1967 events in the United States
Kirtan performers
Krishna in popular culture